Hronské Kosihy is a village and municipality in the Levice District in the Nitra Region of Slovakia.

Etymology
The village was named after the Magyar tribe Keszi.

History
In historical records the village was first mentioned in 1294.

Geography
The village lies at an altitude of 170 metres and covers an area of 7.088 km². It has a population of about 674 people.

Ethnicity
The village is 75% Slovak and 25% Romani.

Facilities
The village has a public library  and a football pitch.

Genealogical resources
The records for genealogical research are available at the state archive "Statny Archiv in Nitra, Slovakia"

 Roman Catholic church records (births/marriages/deaths): 1733-1895 (parish B)

See also
 List of municipalities and towns in Slovakia

References

External links
https://web.archive.org/web/20070513023228/http://www.statistics.sk/mosmis/eng/run.html
Surnames of living people in Hronske Kosihy

Villages and municipalities in Levice District